Douglas Robert Rothschild (born April 27, 1965) is a former American football linebacker who played one season in the National Football League (NFL) for the Chicago Bears. He played college football at Wheaton College in Illinois.

Early life and education
Rothschild was born on April 27, 1965, in Sunnyvale, California. He attended Fremont High School there, before playing college football at Wheaton College in Illinois. At the time of his graduation, with 22 quarterback sacks, he was second all-time among Wheaton players. He recorded nine sacks in both 1985 and 1986, leading the conference in both seasons. Rothschild was inducted into the Wheaton College Hall of Honor in 2007.

Professional career
After going unselected in the 1987 NFL Draft, Rothschild was signed by the Chicago Bears as an undrafted free agent on May 8, 1987. He was released in August but re-signed in late September as a replacement player during the 1987 NFL strike. He appeared in three games, none as a starter, playing linebacker. Rothschild was released at the end of the strike. 

In , Rothschild was signed by the Cincinnati Bengals, and played in their 14–7 victory in the Pro Football Hall of Fame Game. He was released shortly afterwards, ending his professional career.

References

1965 births
Living people
Players of American football from California
Sportspeople from Sunnyvale, California
American football linebackers
Wheaton Thunder football players
Chicago Bears players
Cincinnati Bengals players
National Football League replacement players